Reiner Pommerin (born 17 June 1943) is a German historian specializing in the political and military history of the 18th to 21st centuries.

Pommerin was a visiting fellow at Harvard University's Center of European Studies in 1979–80 and is a professor emeritus at the University of Dresden.

Early life and military service
Reiner Pommerin was born on 17 June 1943 in Rees, Germany. Pommerin began military training with the 2nd Training Regiment of the German Air Force at Stade and initially received training as a flight operations specialist. Pommerin left the Air Force in 1965. In 1969, he acquired his Mittlere Reife and Abitur from an evening school in Hamburg and entered  as a reserve officer. He was made a colonel (Oberst der Reserve).

Academic career
He completed his studies in 1973 after passing his Staatsexamen and was awarded a pedagogical diploma.

Pommerin was awarded the Order of Merit of the Federal Republic of Germany, 1st Class by Franz Josef Jung on 4 June 2008.

Citations

Living people
1943 births
German editors
Literary editors
German military historians
Contemporary historians
Academic staff of the University of Cologne
Academic staff of Johannes Gutenberg University Mainz
Academic staff of the University of Erlangen-Nuremberg
Academic staff of the University of Jena
Academic staff of TU Dresden
German Air Force personnel
Officers Crosses of the Order of Merit of the Federal Republic of Germany